is a railway station in the city of Yurihonjō, Akita Prefecture,  Japan, operated by the third-sector  railway operator Yuri Kōgen Railway.

Lines
Yakushidō Station is served by the Chōkai Sanroku Line, and is located 2.2 kilometers from the terminus of the line at Ugo-Honjō Station.

Station layout
Yakushidō Station has one side platform, serving one bi-directional track. The station is unattended.

Adjacent stations

History
The Yokojō Railway became the Japanese Government Railways (JGR) Yashima Line on September 1, 1937, at which time the signal stop was elevated to a full station. The JGR became the Japanese National Railways (JNR) after World War II. The Yashima Line was privatized on 1 October 1985, becoming the Yuri Kōgen Railway Chōkai Sanroku Line, at which time the station regained its original name. A new station building was completed in October 2009.

Surrounding area

See also
List of railway stations in Japan

External links

Railway stations in Akita Prefecture
Railway stations in Japan opened in 1937
Yurihonjō